Laverda SFC may refer to: 

 Laverda 500SFC, 500cc twin motorcycle
 Laverda 750SFC, 750cc twin motorcycle
 Laverda 1000SFC, 1000cc 3 cylinder motorcycle